Cara Black and Anastasia Rodionova were the defending champions, but Rodionova decided to compete in Brisbane instead. Black partnered up with Marina Erakovic, but they lost in the first round to Abigail Guthrie and Sacha Jones.
Sharon Fichman and Maria Sanchez won the title, defeating Lucie Hradecká and Michaëlla Krajicek in the final, 2–6, 6–0, [10–4].

Seeds

Draw

Draw

References 
Main Round

WTA Auckland Open
ASB Classic – Doubles